Elachista amseli is a moth of the family Elachistidae. It is found in Afghanistan, southern Tajikistan and Turkmenistan.

The forewings are grey-brown to blackish brown, slightly mottled by a whitish base of scales. The hindwings are greyish brown. Adults have been recorded from late May to mid August.

References

amseli
Moths described in 1981
Moths of Asia